Karavukovo is a village in Serbia. It is situated in the Odžaci municipality, in the West Bačka District, Vojvodina province. The village has a Serb ethnic majority and its population numbering 4,991 people (2002 census).

Name

Its name means "the place of the black wolf" in Serbian.

Names in other languages: , .

Historical population

1961: 6,472
1971: 5,925
1981: 5,682
1991: 5,607
2014: 4.574

Notable people born in Karavukovo
Radoslav Samardžić, footballer

See also
List of places in Serbia
List of cities, towns and villages in Vojvodina

References
Slobodan Ćurčić, Broj stanovnika Vojvodine, Novi Sad, 1996.

Gallery

External links 

Places in Bačka
Populated places in West Bačka District
Odžaci